Puerto Rico Highway 156 (PR-156) is a long east–west highway which connects Caguas to Orocovis and is the main artery to Aguas Buenas since the highway from Puerto Rico Highway 52 to the main downtown has at least two lanes and a shoulder per direction. From Aguas Buenas to Orocovis it is a rural, yet safe road which enters all the business districts and plazas of Aguas Buenas, Comerío, Barranquitas and Orocovis. It is one of two long east–west highways through the center of the island (the other being Puerto Rico Highway 111) but it never approaches a coast. Puerto Rico Highway 111 approaches Aguadilla's shore near PR-2 but PR-156, ending in Caguas, is nearly 35 kilometers away from the east coast.

Major intersections

See also

 List of highways numbered 156

References

External links
 

156